Events from the year 1857 in Russia

Incumbents
 Monarch – Alexander II

Events

 
 
  
  
 Franciscan Sisters of the Family of Mary
 Krenholm Manufacturing Company
 Maykop
 Postimees

Births

 17 September - Konstantin Tsiolkovsky (died 1935)

Deaths

References

1857 in Russia
Years of the 19th century in the Russian Empire